Sardarpura is a village of the Tehsil Rajgarh (Rajasthan). It is situated at Latitude (28.524813), Longitude (75.512563) or +28° 31' 29.33" North, +75° 30' 45.23 East. According to the census of India 2011, Sardarpura has the total population 1,695, where male population 901, female population 794, and number of households are 308.

References

Villages in Churu district